José Said Saffie (17 April 1930 – 23 July 2020) was a Peruvian-born Chilean businessman of Palestinian ancestry and the founder and head of Parque Arauco S.A., one of the largest real estate developers and operators of shopping malls in both Chile and Argentina.

References 

1930 births
2020 deaths
People from Arequipa
20th-century Chilean businesspeople
University of Chile alumni
Peruvian people of Palestinian descent
Chilean people of Palestinian descent
Peruvian emigrants to Chile